is a public research university located in Tsukuba, Ibaraki, Japan. It is a top 10 Designated National University, and was ranked Type A by the Japanese government as part of the Top Global University Project.

The university has 28 college clusters and schools with around 16,500 students (as of 2014). The main Tsukuba campus covers an area of 258 hectares (636 acres), making it the second largest single campus in Japan. 

The university branch campus is in Bunkyo-ku, Tokyo, offering graduate programs for working adults in the capital and managing K-12 schools in Tokyo that are attached to the university.

Features 
The university is primarily focused on STEMM fields (Science, Technology, Engineering, Mathematics, Medicine), physical education, and related interdisciplinary fields. This focus is reflected by the university's location in the heart of Tsukuba Science City, alongside over 300 other research institutions. The university counts among its alumni three Nobel laureates (two in Physics and one in Chemistry), and over 70 Olympic athletes.

It has established interdisciplinary PhD programs in both Human Biology and Empowerment Informatics and the International Institute for Integrative Sleep Medicine, which were created through the Ministry of Education, Culture, Sports, Science and Technology's competitive funding projects.

Its Graduate School of Life and Environmental Sciences is represented on the national Coordinating Committee for Earthquake Prediction.

Internationalization 

Their founding philosophy states the University of Tsukuba is "a university which is open to all within and outside of Japan." The university is also known for its internationalization efforts. It has won Japanese government funding projects for internationalization of Japanese universities, including the Ministry of Education, Culture, Sports, Science and Technology's "Global 30" Project and the "Super Global University Project" (formally known as "Top Global University Project"). In the Super Global University Project, University of Tsukuba won Type A funding, which is for 13 elite Japanese universities to be ranked in the top 100 in global university rankings by 2023. Their initiative includes expanding the number of courses and degree programs taught in English only, sharing faculty members with partner institutions such as National Taiwan University, University of Bordeaux, and University of California, Santa Cruz to promote education and research collaboration, and establishing so-called "Course Jukebox System" which enables their and partner institutions' students to take partner institutions' courses as if they are at their original institution.

In 2004, the university established the Alliance for Research on North Africa (ARENA) as an academic research center with the purpose of promoting comprehensive research concerning the North African Region through integration of humanities and sciences. Since then, ARENA has been expanding its research fields, and the university established a branch office in Tunis, Tunisia in 2006. The University of Tsukuba is also accepting African students through the ABE initiative, which was initiated by Japanese Prime Minister Shinzō Abe and is bringing 1,000 African graduate students to Japanese universities in five years from 2014. The University of Tsukuba is planning and leading Japan-Africa Academic Network (JAAN) initiative to bring together all the Japanese universities' resources for Africa and to deepen the academic relationship between Japan and Africa.

In May 2008, the Tokyo International Conference on African Development became an opportunity for the African Development Bank (AfDB) and universities in Japan to promote partnership on higher education, science and technology. Donald Kaberuka, the president of the AfDB, and the president of University of Tsukuba signed a memorandum of understanding during the three-day event. In 2009, the University of Tsukuba participated in the Southeast Asian Ministers of Education Organization's (SEAMEO) affiliated member, and it has been cooperating in the development of education in the ASEAN region. The university is a member of AIMS program, which is to promote regional student mobility among the ASEAN and participated countries including Japan.

As of August 2015, the university has over 300 international inter-university agreements and 13 overseas offices in 12 countries, located in Brazil, China, Germany, France, Indonesia, Kazakhstan, Malaysia, Tunisia, Taiwan, United States, Uzbekistan, and Vietnam.

History 

The university was established in October 1973. It was one of the oldest universities in Japan, . The School of Library and Information Science and the Graduate School of Library and Information – Media Studies were established. 
It has provided several Nobel Prize winners, such as Leo Esaki, Hideki Shirakawa and Sin-Itiro Tomonaga. Dr. Satoshi Ōmura was an auditor at Tokyo University of Education.

Academic rankings

Research performance 
Tsukuba is one of the leading research institutions in Japan. According to Thomson Reuters, Tsukuba is the 10th best research institutions among all the universities and non-educational research institutions in Japan.

 reported that Tsukuba has the 27th highest research standard in Japan in research fundings per researchers in COE Program. In the same article, it's ranked 11th in the quality of education by GP  funds per student.

It has a good research standard in Economics, as Research Papers in Economics ranked Tsukuba as the eighth best Economics research university in January 2011.

Graduate school rankings 
Tsukuba's law school was ranked 19th in 2010 for its passing rate of the Japanese bar examination.

Eduniversal ranked Tsukuba as seventh in the rankings of "Excellent Business Schools nationally strong and/or with continental links" in Japan.

Alumni rankings 
According to the Weekly Economist's 2010 rankings, graduates from Tsukuba have the 64th best employment rate in 400 major companies in Japan. By contrast, the alumni of Tsukuba's average salary is very high with the 8th best in Japan, according to PRESIDENT, Inc.

Popularity and selectivity 
Given its high ranking in Japan, the entrance examination to University of Tsukuba is highly competitive. Overall difficulty is currently graded as "A1" or two on a 10-point scale.

Organization

Undergraduate schools and colleges 
School of Humanities and Culture, with separate colleges for the humanities, for comparative culture and for Japanese language and culture.
School of Social and International Studies, including colleges for social sciences and for international studies.
School of Human Sciences, with separate colleges for education, for psychology and for disability sciences.
School of Life and Environmental Sciences, incorporating colleges for biological sciences, for agro-biological resources and for geoscience.
School of Science and Engineering, with colleges for mathematics, physics, chemistry, engineering sciences and engineering systems, as well as for policy and planning sciences.
School of Informatics, incorporating separate colleges for information sciences; for media arts, science and technology; and for knowledge and library sciences.
School of Medicine and Medical Sciences, including schools of medicine, nursing nd medical sciences.
School of Health and Physical Education.
School of Art and Design.

Graduate schools and programs 

Master's Program in Education
School Leadership and Professional Development
Secondary Education
Graduate School of Humanities and Social Sciences
Doctoral Program in Philosophy
Doctoral Program in History and Anthropology
Doctoral Program in Literature and Linguistics
Master's Program in Modern Languages and Cultures
Doctoral Program in Modern Languages and Cultures
Master's Program in International Public Policy
Doctoral Program in International Public Policy
Master's Program in Economics
Doctoral Program in Economics
Master's Program in Law
Doctoral Program in Law
Master's Program in International Area Studies
Doctoral Program in International and Advanced Japanese Studies
Graduate School of Business Sciences (programs for working individuals)
Master's Program in Systems Management
Master's Program in Advanced Studies of Business Law
Doctoral Program in Systems Management and Business Law
Law School Program
MBA Program in International Business
Graduate School of Pure and Applied Sciences
Master's Program in Mathematics
Doctoral Program in Mathematics
Master's Program in Physics
Doctoral Program in Physics
Master's Program in Chemistry
Doctoral Program in Chemistry
Doctoral Program in Nano-Science and Nano-Technology
Master's Program in Applied Physics
Doctoral Program in Applied Physics
Master's Program in Materials Science
Doctoral Program in Materials Science
Doctoral Program in Materials Sciences and Technology
Graduate School of Systems and Information Engineering
Master's Program in Policy and Planning Sciences
Master's Program in Service Engineering
Doctoral Program in Policy and Planning Sciences
Master's Program in Risk Engineering
Doctoral Program in Risk Engineering
Master's Program in Computer Science
Doctoral Program in Computer Science
Master's Program in Intelligent Interaction Technologies
Doctoral Program in Intelligent Interaction Technologies
Master's Program in Engineering Mechanics and Energy
Doctoral Program in Engineering Mechanics and Energy
Master's Program in Social Systems Engineering
Master's Program in Business Administration and Public Policy
Doctoral Program in Social Systems and Management
Graduate School of Life and Environmental Sciences
Doctoral Program in Integrative Environment and Biomass Sciences
Master's Program in Geosciences
Doctoral Program in Geoenvironmental Sciences
Doctoral Program in Earth Evolution Sciences
Master's Program in Biological Sciences
Doctoral Program in Biological Sciences
Master's Program in Agro-bioresources Science and Technology
Doctoral Program in Appropriate Technology and Sciences for Sustainable Development
Doctoral Program in Biosphere Resource Science and Technology
Doctoral Program in Life Sciences and Bioengineering
Doctoral Program in Bioindustrial Sciences
Master's Program in Environmental Sciences
Doctoral Program in Sustainable Environmental Studies
Doctoral Program in Advanced Agricultural Technology and Sciences
Graduate School of Comprehensive Human Sciences
Master's Program in Medical Sciences (Tokyo Campus (evening programs for working adults))
Master's Program in Sports and Health Promotion
Master's Program in Education Sciences
Doctoral Program in Education
Doctoral Program in School Education
Master's Program in Psychology
Doctoral Program in Psychology
Master's Program in Disability Sciences
Doctoral Program in Disability Sciences
Master's Program in Lifespan Development (Tokyo Campus (evening programs for working adults))
Doctoral Program in Lifespan Developmental Sciences (Tokyo Campus (evening programs for working adults))
Master's Program in Kansei, Behavioral and Brain Sciences
Doctoral Program in Kansei, Behavioral and Brain Sciences
Master's Program in Nursing Sciences
Doctoral Program in Nursing Sciences
Master's Program in Health and Sport Sciences
Doctoral Program in Physical Education, Health and Sport Sciences
Master's Program in Art and Design
Doctoral Program in Art and Design
Master's Program in World Heritage Studies
Doctoral Program in World Cultural Heritage Studies
Doctoral Program in Human Care Science
Doctoral Program in Sports Medicine
Doctoral Program in Coaching Science
Doctoral Program in Biomedical Sciences
Doctoral Program in Clinical Sciences
Graduate School of Library, Information and Media Studies
Master's Program in Library, Information and Media Studies
Doctoral Program in Library, Information and Media Studies
School of Integrative and Global Majors (SIGMA)
PhD Program in Human Biology
PhD Program in Empowerment Informatics
Master's Program in Life Science Innovation
Doctoral Program in Life Science Innovation

Research centers 
Center for Computational Sciences
Shimoda Marine Research Center
Gene Research Center
Plasma Research Center
University's inter-department education research institutes (Research)
Life Science Center of Tsukuba Advanced Research Alliance (Life Science Center of TARA)
International Institute for Integrative Sleep Medicine (WPI-IIIS)
Agricultural and Forestry Research Center
Terrestrial Environment Research Center
Laboratory Animal Resource Center
Sugadaira Montane Research Center
Research Center for University Studies
Proton Medical Research Center
Tsukuba Industrial Liaison and Cooperative Research Center
Center for Research on International Cooperation in Educational Development
Research Center for Knowledge Communities
Tsukuba Research Center for Interdisciplinary Materials Science
Special Needs Education Research Center
The Alliance for Research on North Africa
Academic Computing and Communications Center
Research Facility Center for Science and Technology
Radioisotope Center
Tsukuba Critical Path Research and Education Integrated Leading Center
Center for Cybernics Research
University's inter-department education research institutes (student support)
Foreign Language Center
Sport and Physical Education Center
International Student Center
Admission Center
University Health Center

University libraries 
 Central Library (Central Area, Tsukuba Campus)
 Art and Physical Education Library (South Area, Tsukuba Campus)
 Medical Library (West Area, Tsukuba Campus)
 Library on Library and Information Science (Kasuga Area, Tsukuba Campus)
 Otsuka Library (Tokyo Bunkyo School Building)

University hospital 
 University of Tsukuba Hospital (Tsukuba Campus)

Laboratory schools 
Education Bureau of the Laboratory Schools
Illm|Elementary School, University of Tsukuba
Junior High School at Otsuka
Junior High School at Komaba
Senior High School at Otsuka
Senior High School at Komaba
Senior High School at Sakado
Special Needs Education School for the Visually Impaired
Special Needs Education School for the Deaf
Special Needs Education School for the Mentally Challenged
Special Needs Education School for the Physically Challenged
Special Needs Education School for Children with Autism

Famous alumni

Politicians 
 Kiyoko Ono – (70th Chair of National Public Safety Commission)
 Stergomena Tax – 4th Executive Secretary of the Southern African Development Community

Academics 
Yukihiro Matsumoto – free software programmer, Chief designer of the Ruby programming language
John Maeda – Current President of the Rhode Island School of Design
Hiromichi Kataura – Synthesis and characterization of single-wall and double-wall carbon nanotubes
Opal suwannamek – Professor at the King Mongkut's Institute of Technology Ladkrabang (Thailand)
Eiji Otsuka – social critic, anthropologist and novelist. Professor at International Research Center for Japanese Studies, Kyoto
Achara Hotrabhavananda – Lecturer at Rangsit University , Thailand
 Moi Meng Ling – Professor, the University of Tokyo, virologist

Businessmen 
Yutaka Emura – President of Emurasoft, developer of EmEditor text editor
Kōta Matsuda – CEO of Tully's Coffee Japan
Yukihiro Matsumoto – the chief designer of the Ruby programming language
Daiyu Nobori – CEO of Softether
Akira Morikawa – CEO of LINE Corporation
Yoshiyuki Sankai – founder and CEO of Cyberdyne

Athletes 
Yudai Baba – basketball player
Sawao Kato – Gymnastics, 8 Olympic gold medalist
Go Oiwa – Football player and manager
Kaoru Mitoma – Football player
Shogo Taniguchi – Football player
Kenta Hasegawa – Football player and manager
Masami Ihara – Football player
Masashi Nakayama – Football player
Sōta Hirayama (dropout) – Football player
Saki Kumagai – Football player
Toshiya Fujita – Football player
Takayoshi Yoshioka – track and field athlete (Tokyo University of Education)
Miwako Motoyoshi – Synchronized swimming, Olympic bronze medalist
Toshinobu Kawai – Short track speed skating, Olympic bronze medalist
Hirotaka Okada – Judo, Olympic bronze medalist
Yōko Sakagami – Judo, Olympic bronze medalist
Chiyo Tateno – Judo, Olympic bronze medalist
Yoko Tanabe – Judo, Olympic silver medalist
Noriko Narazaki (Noriko Narasaki|Sugawara) – Judo, Olympic silver and bronze medalist
Fumiko Esaki – Judo, Olympic silver medalist
Ayumi Tanimoto – Judo, Olympic gold medalist
Midori Shintani – Judo, World judo championship gold medalist
Naoki Murata – Judo, 7th dan judoka, author, curator of the Kodokan Judo Museum
Yuya Takenouchi – 2014 All Japan Kendo Champion
Kenshiro Matsuzaki – 2020 All Japan Kendo Champion
Kentaro Takahashi - Volleyball Player

Entertainers 
Riyoko Ikeda – Manga artist (Tokyo University of Education/dropout)
Ryōko Nagata – Voice actor
Miki Itō – Voice actor
Shunichi Miyamoto – Musician

Artists and Writers 
Ay-O – Japanese conceptual artist
Tian Han – Chinese playwright
Toshio Iwai – Media artist and game designer

Controversies 
The University of Tsukuba has been embroiled in a number of controversies during its relatively short existence. According to Debito Arudou, the university's dealings with foreign staff members has proven particularly controversial. Arudou notes that in 1985 the university decided to terminate the contracts of foreign teaching staff resulting in litigation being brought against the institution. An account of the university's poor treatment of and breaking of contractual obligations with foreign staff is also included in Ivan Hall's Cartels of the Mind.

On 12 July 1991, the university became the site of a murder when the Japanese translator of Salman Rushdie's The Satanic Verses, Hitoshi Igarashi, was killed in the context of the fatwas initiated by Ayatollah Ruhollah Khomeini following the book's publication. Igarashi's murder case was closed in 2006 with no suspects having been brought to trial.

Between 2019 and 2021, a number of controversies revolving around the university's president Kyosuke Nagata came to light. Under Nagata's leadership the university became the first institution of higher education to receive large scale funding from the Ministry of Defense in December 2019. According to Alexandra Sakaki and Sebastian Maslow 'Illustrating a lack of consensus within the Japanese academic community...the university's official decision has triggered internal backlash and fierce criticism from academic and civic groups.' Indeed, the decision was heavily criticized by both the Science Council of Japan and Japanese academics. Critics were particularly dismayed by the fact that this marked a complete u-turn in university policy – only one year earlier in December 2018, the university had issued a policy statement against military research on campus.

The university met controversy again in 2020 when Nagata was re-elected as its president despite losing the faculty's ballot by almost two-thirds of the vote. Additionally, the president's selection committee decided to scrap limits on the president's term of office allowing Nagata to remain in charge indefinitely. This created backlash amongst academic staff resulting in the genesis of a campaign against Nagata's presidency.

In 2021, journalists discovered discrepancies in the number of international students that the university had reported to the Times Higher Education World University Rankings and Japanese University Rankings. The 2021 world rankings claimed 20% of the student body were international students positioning the university as one of the most diverse higher education institutions in the country, however, the Japanese rankings claimed that only 12.6% of the student body were international students. As a result, Times Higher Education launched an investigation and advised the university on its submission of data in the future. The erroneous data was also submitted to the government when the university applied for the status of “Designated National University” (指定国立大学) in 2020. As such, the matter was discussed in the National Diet on 21 April 2021. Critics have suggested that the university is attempting to circumvent its short comings in research which negatively affects its ranking by falsifying data.

Partner Institution

Malaysia
University of Malaya 
University Sains Malaysia
Universiti Teknologi Malaysia
Universiti Kebangsaan Malaysia
Universiti Putra Malaysia
Universiti Tunku Abdul Rahman
Universiti Utara Malaysia

References

External links 

Japanese national universities
Tsukuba, Ibaraki
Educational institutions established in 1872
 
1872 establishments in Japan
Super Global Universities